Rio do Oeste is a municipality in the state of Santa Catarina in the South region of Brazil.

References

Municipalities in Santa Catarina (state)